Santuario (elevation 1575 m) is a town and municipality in the Department of Risaralda, Colombia.

Tourism 
One of the main characteristics of the town is the yearly observance of religious holidays and local fairs.

Sites of interest
 Tatamá National Natural Park
 Maria Inmaculada's Church
 Calle Real

References

Municipalities of Risaralda Department